Asian Highway 16 (AH16) is a road in the Asian Highway Network running  from Tak, Thailand to Đông Hà, Vietnam connecting AH1 and AH2 to AH1 after AH1 takes a turn from south to North after crossing Cambodia. The route is as follows:

Thailand
 Route 12: Tak - Phitsanulok- Khon Kaen - Somdet - Mukdahan 
 Route 212: Mukdahan - Bang Sai Yai
 Route 239: Second Thai–Lao Friendship Bridge

Laos
  Route 9W: Savannakhet - Xeno
  Route 9E: Xeno - Xépôn - Dansavan

Vietnam
  QL9: Lao Bảo - Đông Hà

Asian Highway Network
Roads in Thailand
Roads in Vietnam
Roads in Laos